My Bare Lady is a 1963 exploitation film directed by Arthur Knight (film critic) about a young American woman visiting Great Britain who meets and falls in love with a U.S. Korean War veteran who is involved with a local nudist camp. The young woman is initially distressed at the man's clothing-free lifestyle, but later changes her mind and sheds her garments when a kindly housekeeper relates a romantic story of a young couple who fell in love in Paris and later married at a British nudist colony.

My Bare Lady was also released with the titles Bare Lady, Bare World, It's a Bare World and My Seven Little Bares.

References

External links

1963 films
1960s romance films
British black-and-white films
1960s exploitation films
1960s English-language films